Montague Township is a civil township of Muskegon County in the U.S. state of Michigan. The population was 1,637 at the 2000 census. The city of Montague is located within the township, on the shores of White Lake.

Geography
According to the United States Census Bureau, the township has a total area of 19.3 square miles (49.9 km), of which 18.9 square miles (49.0 km) is land and 0.4 square mile (1.0 km) (1.92%) is water.

Clear Springs Nature Preserve is located in the township.

Demographics
As of the census of 2000, there were 1,637 people, 601 households, and 456 families residing in the township. The racial makeup of the township was 95.97% White, 1.41% African American, 1.22% Native American, 0.18% Asian, 0.61% from other races, and 0.61% from two or more races. Hispanic or Latino of any race were 2.02% of the population.

There were 601 households, out of which 34.3% had children under the age of 18 living with them, 63.7% were married couples living together, 8.5% had a female householder with no husband present, and 24.1% were non-families. 19.0% of all households were made up of individuals, and 9.0% had someone living alone who was 65 years of age or older.  The average household size was 2.67 and the average family size was 3.05.

In the township the population was spread out, with 25.7% under the age of 18, 9.1% from 18 to 24, 27.6% from 25 to 44, 25.6% from 45 to 64, and 12.0% who were 65 years of age or older.  The median age was 37 years. For every 100 females, there were 102.9 males.  For every 100 females age 18 and over, there were 100.2 males.

The median income for a household in the township was $41,534, and the median income for a family was $46,471. Males had a median income of $35,650 versus $23,958 for females. The per capita income for the township was $17,695.  About 4.1% of families and 7.1% of the population were below the poverty line, including 7.6% of those under age 18 and 2.7% of those age 65 or over.

Notable people
President Abraham Lincoln's first cousin, Hannah Lincoln Sammis, is buried in the township.

References

External links
Montague Township Official Website
White Lake Chamber of Commerce

Townships in Muskegon County, Michigan
Townships in Michigan